Mariano Simon Garriga (May 30, 1886 – February 21, 1965) was an American prelate of the Roman Catholic Church. He served as bishop of the Diocese of Corpus Christi in Texas from 1949 until his death in 1965.

Biography

Early life 
Mariano Garriga was born on May 30, 1886, in Port Isabel, Texas, to Frank and Elizabeth (née Baker) Garriga. He studied at St. Mary College in Kansas City, Kansas, and at St. Francis Seminary in Milwaukee, Wisconsin. 

Garriga was ordained to the priesthood by Archbishop John William Shaw for the Archdiocese of San Antonio on July 2, 1911. He served as assistant chancellor of the archdiocese until 1912, when he was appointed as a curate to a parish in Marfa, Texas.In 1915, he was named vice-rector of St. John Seminary in San Antonio. Garriga served as a chaplain to the Texas National Guard during World War I, training with the 36th Infantry Division. From 1919 to 1936, he served as pastor of St. Cecilia Parish in San Antonio. He also served as president of Incarnate Word College in San Antonio. He was a professor at St. John Seminary from 1921 to 1936, and became historian of the archdiocese in 1926. Garriga was raised to the rank of papal chamberlain in October 1934, and to domestic prelate in September 1935.

Coadjutor Bishop and Bishop of Corpus Christi 
On June 20, 1936, Garriga was appointed coadjutor bishop of the Diocese of Corpus Christi and Titular Bishop of Syene by Pope Pius XI. Garriga received his episcopal consecration on September 21, 1936, from Archbishop Arthur Drossaerts, with Bishops Emmanuel Ledvina and Aloisius Muench serving as co-consecrators. He was the first Catholic bishop of a Texas diocese to be born in the state. In addition to his episcopal duties, he served as pastor of St. Peter Parish in Laredo, Texas (1936-1948). 

Upon the resignation of Bishop Ledvina, Garriga succeed him as the third Bishop of Corpus Christi on March 15, 1949. During his 16-year-long tenure, he founded a minor seminary in 1960 and established several parochial schools.

Mariano Garriga died in Corpus Christi on February 21, 1965, at age 78. He is buried in the crypt of Corpus Christi Cathedral.

References

External links
Roman Catholic Diocese of Corpus Christi

Episcopal succession

1886 births
1965 deaths
Participants in the Second Vatican Council
People from Cameron County, Texas
People from Corpus Christi, Texas
St. Francis Seminary (Wisconsin) alumni
Saint Mary's Academy and College alumni
United States Army chaplains
University of the Incarnate Word
World War I chaplains
Catholics from Texas
20th-century Roman Catholic bishops in the United States
Military personnel from Texas